PAF Base Bholari near the town of Bholari, located in Jamshoro District in Sindh Province, northeast of Karachi. It is one of Pakistan's most modern main operational bases which was inaugurated in December 2017. Construction of the base started in December 2015. As of now No. 19 Sqn PAF (equipped with F-16 jet fighter aircraft) and No. 18 Sqn PAF (equipped with JF-17 A/B is based there .

In 2020 the base hosted Exercise Shaheen IX, a joint Pakistani-Chinese aerial exercise. 
It is also equipped with AEWACs (SAAB 2000)Aircraft

References

Pakistan Air Force bases